Holohalaelurus is a genus of catshark in the family Scyliorhinidae, commonly known as Izak catsharks or hallelujah sharks.

Member species of this genus are distributed in the western Indian Ocean off the coasts of various Southern African and East African countries, from Kenya to Namibia.

Species
 Holohalaelurus favus Human, 2006 (honeycomb Izak)
 Holohalaelurus grennian Human, 2006 (grinning Izak)
 Holohalaelurus melanostigma (Norman, 1939) (crying Izak)
 Holohalaelurus punctatus (Gilchrist, 1914) (white-spotted Izak)
 Holohalaelurus regani (Gilchrist, 1922) (Izak catshark)

References

 

 
Shark genera
Taxa named by Henry Weed Fowler